Honeybourne railway station serves the village of Honeybourne in Worcestershire, England.

The station was closed in 1969, after the withdrawal of stopping services to Stratford-upon Avon and closure to freight. The whole of the Stratford to Cheltenham line was closed in late August 1976, after derailment of some wagons on a goods train damaged a section of the track. Honeybourne was reopened in 1981, in connection with residential development near the station.

History

Opening and expansion
The OWW became the West Midland Railway in 1860, which in turn amalgamated with the Great Western Railway in 1863.

The curve, which was later known as the "East Loop", was controlled by a single signalbox that was one of the first in the country to have an interlocking frame mechanically preventing conflicting signal and point levers being pulled. North of the platforms was a small goods yard comprising two sidings and a small engine shed, which was used to stable engines that banked goods trains over the steep incline to Campden.

A  turntable was added after the opening of the link to Stratford, as it was a requirement of the Board of Trade to have one at both ends of a branch line. This was probably taken up in 1870 with the construction of a new engine shed, which itself only lasted until 1907 when it was demolished to enlarge the goods yard. Its replacement built in 1909 was burnt down on 13 September 1911 and was not rebuilt, with only a small coaling platform being provided. A Brunel-designed "chalet" type station building was provided on the "Down" platform, but this only lasted until 1872.

As at one or two other GWR locations, the direction naming here is semi-notional:  the OWWR main line was considered to run south (London/Oxford) to north (Worcester), with Cheltenham to the west and Stratford-upon-Avon to the east, despite the former actually running closer to E-W and the latter closer to N-S.  The "West Loop" thus ran from the station to the Cheltenham line, whilst the "South Loop" connected the Stratford and Oxford lines. Four signalboxes, one at each end of the loops, controlled traffic. The new lines through the station were served by four platform faces: a "Down" main, an "Up" relief and an island platform (also ) which served the Worcester line. The old "Up" platform building was replaced by large waiting facilities and a refreshment room; a waiting shelter was provided on the "Up" branch platform and a footbridge spanned the four tracks. Two further signalboxes were provided: Station North box opened at the Worcester end on the north side of the Up main line in 1909 to control a goods loop which ran parallel with the main line, and Station South box was positioned south of the main line to control the London end of the station plus a siding and loop line behind the box.

Decline and closure
Honeybourne generated very little traffic of its own and the agricultural produce that it did handle was dwarfed by interchange returns. Traffic picked up during the Second World War when the station's geographical location at the crossroads of several routes meant that it was very busy. A new yard was opened at Honeybourne West Loop in 1960 to handle iron ore flows which were re-routed via the Stratford to Cheltenham line to relieve the Great Western Main Line. In the same year, the Honeybourne to Cheltenham local service was withdrawn, although through express trains such as the Cornishman continued to use the line until 9 September 1962 after when they were worked via  . A gradual rundown of goods facilities at Honeybourne began on 1 June 1964 with the closure of the station to freight, after which the majority of the sidings were abolished and the goods loops were taken out of use. Station North box was closed on 4 April 1965, with the south loop and South Loop box following on 13 October 1965. The West Loop box was switched out on 31 January 1966 and only used when required until 1970, while the station became unstaffed from 16 January 1967. The North Loop signalbox had already closed in March 1933, when its junction came under the control of Station South box.

The station closed to passengers on 5 May 1969, the last day of regular passenger services between Stratford and Evesham via Honeybourne. This rendered the east loop redundant and it was taken out of use on 3 November 1970. East Loop box closed permanently, but West Loop box and three long sidings were brought back into use to enable goods trains from Worcester to reach . The Stratford-Cheltenham line was used for a modest amount of freight until 1976 when a derailment south of  prompted the closure of the line except for a section between the West Loop sidings and Long Marston. This section was singled on 24 March 1980 when West Loop box was also closed. The following year a new chord was laid on the formation of the former east loop which allowed the reversal of trains at West Loop to be discontinued and the sidings there to be closed, followed by the replacement of Honeybourne (Station) South box with a 2-lever frame on 7 March 1983.

Present day

Residential development around Honeybourne partly due to its proximity to Long Lartin prison, as well as pressure from the Cotswold Line Promotion Group, led to the ceremonial reopening of the station on 22 May 1981, with the first public services running two days later. The southernmost of Honeybourne's five former platforms was reopened, in what was British Rail's 66th station reopening since 1966. Passenger facilities were very basic and consisted only of a Portakabin and a Portaloo. On the night of 15 May 1985, the reinstated east loop was used to stable the Royal Train which was being used by Prince Philip while visiting the area. In 1981, the structure of Honeybourne North box was donated to the heritage railway by a local resident who had erected it in his garden as a shed. It was subsequently reused at Toddington as a classroom for the Signal & Telegraph department.

By the turn of the 21st century, passenger numbers at Honeybourne were slowly increasing: from an estimated 13,360 in 1997–98 to an estimated 22,077 in 2004–05. Since then the number of passengers using the station has increased rapidly, and the estimated total for 2018–19 was more than 66,000. Estimated passenger totals have risen by 78% in 10 years and trebled in 14 years.

Until 22 August 2011 only a single platform face was in use at the station. Passive provision was made for the eventual arrival of the heritage Gloucestershire Warwickshire Railway in the shape of a third platform face on the former "Down" branch side of the new platform. The works also involved relocating the connection to and from the branch to Long Marston to the Evesham side of the station together with a trailing crossover and laying three new sidings for track machines formerly stabled at Moreton-in-Marsh.

The track to the east remains as a link to the large ex-Ministry of Defence depot at Long Marston. The Stratford on Avon and Broadway Railway Society aimed to adopt this stretch as a heritage railway and restore the line to Stratford. The society has since been dissolved, however, leaving any heritage connection to be made by the Gloucestershire Warwickshire Railway.

The Shakespeare Line Promotion Group is promoting a scheme to reinstate the  "missing Link" between Honeybourne and Stratford. Called the "Avon Rail Link", the scheme (supported as a freight diversionary route by DB Schenker) would make Stratford-upon-Avon railway station a through station once again with improved connections to the Cotswolds and the South. The scheme faces local opposition. There is, however, a good business case for Stratford-Cotswolds link.

Passenger services at Honeybourne are operated by Great Western Railway.

References

Notes

Sources

External links

Honeybourne Station on navigable 1946 O.S. map

Railway stations in Worcestershire
DfT Category F2 stations
Former Great Western Railway stations
Railway stations in Great Britain opened in 1853
Railway stations in Great Britain closed in 1969
Reopened railway stations in Great Britain
Railway stations in Great Britain opened in 1985
Railway stations served by Great Western Railway